Barry John Upton (born 25 February 1954) is an English singer, songwriter, arranger, musician and producer of various musical genres, including pop, rock and electronic dance. He is also an audio engineer and stage performer, having appeared around the world in various capacities. He now lives in Pattaya, Thailand, where he continues writing, producing and performing music. In addition, he is the executive producer for radio & TV at Pattaya People Media Group and has been presenting the morning show on 96FM Radio since 2010.

Career
In the early 1980s, Upton was a member of Brotherhood of Man, appearing in concert with them internationally. Although not a member of the band at the time of their win at the Eurovision Song Contest, he was their musical arranger and co-wrote much of their material during his time with them in 1982-1984. In 1997 he created the million selling pop band, Steps.

His writing and/or production credits include:

Lightning Flash – Brotherhood of Man (1983)
"I'm in the Mood For Dancing '89" – The Nolans (1989)
"Only Fools (Never Fall in Love)" – Sonia (1991)
"5,6,7,8" – UK Top Twenty hit co-written with Steve Crosby – Steps (1997)
Dollar's Greatest Hits – Dollar (re-recorded versions)
"Bunsen Burner" – UK Top Ten hit co-written with John Otway (2002)
Gold: Greatest Hits – Steps (2002)
"Cheeky Flamenco" – The Cheeky Girls (2003)
"You've Got Me Dancing" (featured in the movie, Little Miss Sunshine, and co-written with Gordon Pogoda)
"Gasoline" and "World Ain't Over" – Pedwell (2007)
The Complete Halloween Party Album (2007)
My Favourite TV Themes (2008)

My Favourite Musicals 1
 My Favourite Musicals 2 
 The Grease Party

References

External links

1954 births
Living people
People from Hastings
English composers
English songwriters
English record producers
English pop singers
English audio engineers
Brotherhood of Man members